Leptostylus transversus is a species of longhorn beetles of the subfamily Lamiinae. It was described by Gyllenhal in 1817.

Subspecies
 Leptostylus transversus transversus (Gyllenhal in Schoenherr, 1817)
 Leptostylus transversus dakotensis Dillon, 1956
 Leptostylus transversus dietrichi Dillon, 1956
 Leptostylus transversus floridellus Dillon, 1956

References

Leptostylus
Beetles described in 1817